The Town of Nazareth is a 1914 American silent short drama film starring Ed Coxen, Charlotte Burton, William Bertram, Albert Cavens, Jean Durrell, George Field and Winifred Greenwood.

Cast
 Ed Coxen as Ralph Rosney, the Poet-Philosopher
 William Bertram as Wilson, a wealthy cloth manufacturer
 Charlotte Burton as Miriam, his daughter
 Josephine Ditt as Jane Rosney, Ralph's sister
 George Field as Walter Castler, who married the girl he loves
 Winifred Greenwood as Mary
 Albert Cavens as Frank, son of Mary and Walter, age 5

External links

1914 films
1914 drama films
Silent American drama films
American silent short films
American black-and-white films
1914 short films
1910s American films